British Columbia Highway 2, known locally as the Tupper Highway, is one of the two short connections from Dawson Creek to the border between B.C. and Alberta.  The actual '2' designation has a more complex history than that of the highway that carries it today. When Highway 2 was first designated in 1941, it followed the present-day route of the Cariboo Highway between Cache Creek and Prince George. In 1952, Highway 2 was extended along the John Hart Highway all the way through Dawson Creek to the border between B.C. and Alberta at Tupper.  In 1953, the section of Highway 2 between Cache Creek and Dawson Creek was given the designation of '97', and the designations of 2 and 97 co-existed until 1962, when the '2' designation was removed from the Cariboo and John Hart Highways.

Route details
It starts in Dawson Creek at its junction with Highway 97, and proceeds southeast for  past the small settlement of Pouce Coupe, to its junction with Highway 52 near Tupper.

Major intersections
From west to east. The entire route is in the Peace River Regional District.

References

External links 

Official Numbered Routes in British Columbia by British Columbia Driving & Transportation

002
Dawson Creek